Wendy Very Flores (b. 5 October 1977) is an Ecuadorian composer, songwriter, record producer, and politician. Currently, she is a member of the National Assembly of Ecuador.

Biography

Wendy Veras was born in Guayaquil on 5 October 1977. From childhood, she showed an interest in music and art, learning to play the piano. Though her family wanted Veras to study a different vocation with better potential for financial security, she joined tecnocumbia group Caña Dulce when she was 17. While in her third year of law school in 1999, Veras formed Las Chicas Dulces, with Lila Flores as its vocalist and Veras its manager. Veras contracted Hodgkin's lymphoma, so she suspended her studies and sought chemotherapy in Solca, Romania. She stopped managing Las Dulces Chicas and though her health improved, the group dissolved.

In 2005, Veras was hired by the Ventura Music Group company Alejandro Jaén, since merged with Sony Music, to compose music for television. In 2011, she composed Miento to be performed by Angélica Vale for a webnovela on Univision, in Mexico. She has also composed music for Lorena Rojas and Julio Iglesias Jr., and was nominated for Billboard magazine's prize for regional music.

Citations

1977 births
Living people
21st-century Ecuadorian women singers
Ecuadorian composers
Members of the National Congress (Ecuador)
PAIS Alliance politicians
Women members of the National Assembly (Ecuador)
21st-century Ecuadorian women politicians
21st-century Ecuadorian politicians